Margarita Peña ( Concepción Margarita Peña Muñoz; August 21, 1937October 7, 2018) was a Mexican writer, translator and researcher, doctor of letters, teacher and emeritus professor at the National Autonomous University of Mexico. Her work focused on Mexican literature of the 16th, 17th, and 18th centuries. Her awards include: Premio Universidad Nacional, Premio de la Cámara Nacional de la Industria Editorial, Premio Huehuetlatolli, Premio de Crítica Literaria, and Premio ComuArte.

Early life and education
Concepción Margarita Peña Muñoz was born in Mexico City, August 21, 1937.

She received her bachelor's and master's degrees in Hispanic literature at the National Autonomous University of Mexico; and her doctorate from El Colegio de México.

Career
She was a professor of New Spanish literature, as well as of Golden Age literature. She served as a teacher at the undergraduate level for more than thirty years at the Faculty of Philosophy and Letters of the National Autonomous University of Mexico. She belonged to the Sistema Nacional de Investigadores (SNI) (level III) since 2003 and was Coordinator of the Extraordinary Chair "Juan Ruiz de Alarcón". She taught in various universities in Mexico and abroad.

She was widely activity in the world of letters, her work extending to the creation of articles, essays, critical editions, compilations and anthologies, short stories, essays, and newspaper articles, among others. Her constant work in the Archivo General de la Nación gave her access to letters, sonnets, romances, declarations of prisoners, spells, and even a fragment of a treatise on palmistry. The work that brings together a wide variety of these writings is called La palabra amordazada, and presents literature censored by the Mexican Inquisition during the colonial period. She wrote more than thirty essays. Her impressive work in document rescue makes her an important Mexican writer and literary figure. The critical edition of the New Spanish songbook of the 16th century, Flores de baria poesía, is part of her work, as is the novel, El amarre.

Personal life

Pena's husband was Federico Campbell. They had one son, the journalist, Federico Campbell Peña.

She died of heart problems in Mexico City, October 7, 2018.

Awards and honours
Her awards and honours include:
 1993, Premio Universidad Nacional
 1991, Premio de la Cámara Nacional de la Industria Editorial
 1986, Premio Huehuetlatolli from the Chamber of Deputies
 2000, Premio de Crítica Literaria from the Universidad Autónoma de Ciudad Juárez
 2000, Premio COMUARTE (Coordinadora Internacional de Mujeres en el Arte)

Selected works

The titles of her other works are: 
 Emisión y emblemática de un oráculo hispanoitaliano
 Juan Ruiz de Alarcón: reconstrucción biográfico-crítica
 Mofarandel de los oráculos de Apolo
 Libro del juego de las suertes
 Literatura entre dos mundos
 Descubrimiento y conquista de América
 Los cuadernos de Sor Juana
 Juan Ruiz de Alarcón ante la crítica
 La palabra amordazada
 Quiromancia y adivinación en la Nueva España
 El teatro novohispano en el siglo XVIII
 Los varios tonos de la relación Lope de Vega-Juan Ruiz de Alarcón
 Aventuras de Lula y el duende piernas largas
 Alarcón, Cervantes: Una mirada alterna

References

1937 births
2018 deaths
People from Mexico City
20th-century Mexican writers
20th-century Mexican educators
21st-century Mexican writers
21st-century Mexican educators
20th-century Mexican women writers
21st-century Mexican women writers
Women educators
Mexican non-fiction writers
Mexican translators
National Autonomous University of Mexico alumni
Academic staff of the National Autonomous University of Mexico
El Colegio de México alumni